Bradley John McGee OAM (born 24 February 1976 in Sydney, New South Wales) is an Australian former professional racing cyclist. He is currently the head coach of the New South Wales Institute of Sport (NSWIS). He started cycling in 1986 at the age of ten. He lives in Sydney and in Nice, France.

Career
His greatest success as a road cyclist has been winning the 2003 prologue of the Tour de France, and leading the race for three days in 2003. In 2004 he wore the leader's pink jersey of the Giro d'Italia for one day. In 2005 he wore the leader's golden jersey for four days in the Vuelta a España. He was the first Australian to lead the Tour of Spain, and the first to wear the leader's jersey of all three Grand Tours.

As a track cyclist and Australian Institute of Sport scholarship holder he met success in individual and team events. He won a gold medal at the 2004 Summer Olympics in Athens as a member of the team pursuit (with Graeme Brown, Brett Lancaster, and Luke Roberts) in world record time of 3:58.233. He won a silver medal for the Olympic 4000m pursuit. At the 2000 Summer Olympics in his home town of Sydney, he set an Australian record of 4 minutes 19.25 seconds, and won a bronze medal for the pursuit. In Atlanta at the 1996 Summer Olympics he won two bronze medals, for the individual pursuit and the team pursuit.

At the 1994 Commonwealth Games he won gold medals in the individual and team pursuit. At the 1998 Commonwealth Games he defended his Commonwealth titles to win gold in both events. At the 2002 Commonwealth Games he won the individual pursuit.

He was awarded the Order of Australia Medal (OAM) in the 2005 Australia Day Honours List. Other awards include:
1993 Australian Male Cyclist of the year
1994 NSW junior male cyclist of the year
1995 NSW cyclist of the year
2002 Australian Male Track Cyclist of the Year
2017 Sport Australia Hall of Fame athlete inductee

Bradley McGee is today a member of the 'Champions for Peace' club, a group of 54 famous elite athletes committed to serving peace in the world through sport, created by Peace and Sport, a Monaco-based international organisation.

Major results

Track

1993
 1st  Individual pursuit, UCI Junior Track World Championships
 National Junior Track Championships
1st  Individual pursuit
1st  Teams pursuit
1994
 Commonwealth Games
1st  Individual pursuit
1st  Team pursuit
 UCI Junior Track World Championships
1st  Individual pursuit
1st  Team pursuit
 National Junior Track Championships
1st  Elimination race
1st  Individual pursuit
1st  Scratch race
1st  Team pursuit
1995
 1st  Team pursuit, UCI Track World Championships
 National Track Championships
1st  Individual pursuit
1st  Team pursuit
1996
 Olympic Games
3rd  Individual pursuit 
3rd  Team pursuit
1997
 National Track Championships
1st  Individual pursuit
1st  Team pursuit
 1st  Individual pursuit – Quartu Sant'Elena, UCI Track World Cup Classics
1998
 Commonwealth Games
1st  Individual pursuit
1st  Team pursuit
1999
 Oceania International Grand Prix
1st  Individual pursuit
1st  Team pursuit
2000
 3rd  Individual pursuit, Olympic Games
2002
 1st  Individual pursuit, UCI Track World Championships
 1st  Individual pursuit, Commonwealth Games
2004
 Olympic Games
1st  Team pursuit
2nd  Individual pursuit
 1st  Individual pursuit – Manchester, UCI Track World Cup Classics
2007
 3rd  Individual pursuit – Manchester, UCI Track World Cup Classics
2008
 1st  Team pursuit – Los Angeles, UCI Track World Cup Classics
 3rd  Team pursuit, UCI Track World Championships

Road

1993
 1st  Time trial, National Junior Road Championships
1996
 1st Stage 2 Tour of Cologne
1998
 9th Chrono des Nations
1999
 Tour de l'Avenir
1st Stages 3 (ITT) & 10
 1st Prologue Tour de Normandie
 8th Overall Tour de Wallonie
2000
 1st Stage 5 Herald Sun Tour
2001
 1st Stage 4 Grand Prix du Midi Libre
 1st Stage 2b (ITT) Route du Sud
 4th Overall Circuit de la Sarthe
 7th Paris–Camembert
 10th Grand Prix Eddy Merckx (with Jacky Durand)
2002
 1st Stage 7 Tour de France
 Critérium du Dauphiné Libéré
1st  Points classification
1st Prologue
 2nd Overall Circuit de la Sarthe
 2nd Overall GP Erik Breukink 
 10th Overall Critérium International
 10th Tour de Vendée
2003
 Tour de France
1st Prologue
Held  after Stages 1–3
 1st Stage 8 (ITT) Tour de Suisse
 2nd Overall Ronde van Nederland
1st Stage 6 
 3rd Overall Tour de Picardie
 5th Grand Prix Eddy Merckx (with Baden Cooke)
 6th Grand Prix du Morbihan
 8th Overall Circuit de la Sarthe
 8th Grand Prix de Rennes 
2004
 1st  Overall Route du Sud
1st Stage 3 (ITT)
 8th Overall Giro d'Italia
1st Prologue
Held  after Stages 1 & 3–4
 8th Grand Prix des Nations 
 9th Overall Tour de Romandie
1st Prologue 
2005
 1st Grand Prix de Villers-Cotterêts
 8th Overall Tour de Suisse
1st  Points classification
1st Stage 3 
 Vuelta a España
Held  after Stages 1–4
2006
 8th Overall La Méditerranéenne

Grand Tour general classification results timeline

References

External links
 
 
 
 

1976 births
Living people
Australian Institute of Sport cyclists
Australian male cyclists
Australian Tour de France stage winners
Tour de Suisse stage winners
Cyclists at the 1996 Summer Olympics
Cyclists at the 2000 Summer Olympics
Cyclists at the 2004 Summer Olympics
Cyclists at the 2008 Summer Olympics
Olympic cyclists of Australia
Recipients of the Medal of the Order of Australia
Cyclists from Sydney
Olympic gold medalists for Australia
Olympic silver medalists for Australia
Olympic bronze medalists for Australia
Cyclists at the 1994 Commonwealth Games
Cyclists at the 1998 Commonwealth Games
Cyclists at the 2002 Commonwealth Games
Tour de France prologue winners
Australian Giro d'Italia stage winners
Commonwealth Games gold medallists for Australia
Olympic medalists in cycling
Medalists at the 2004 Summer Olympics
UCI Track Cycling World Champions (men)
Medalists at the 2000 Summer Olympics
Medalists at the 1996 Summer Olympics
Commonwealth Games medallists in cycling
Sport Australia Hall of Fame inductees
Australian track cyclists
Medallists at the 2002 Commonwealth Games